SWIV 3D (also known as SWIV 3D Assault) is a 3D video game remake of SWIV developed and published by Sales Curve Interactive in 1996. It is the last game in the Silkworm/SWIV series and the only game of the series to use a voxel-based 3D engine.

Gameplay
In SWIV 3D the player must pilot a helicopter navigating through a series of landscapes destroying buildings to fulfil mission goals. There are also opportunities to use an armoured SUV.

Development
SCi attempted to license some tracks by Hallucinogen for the soundtrack, but due to a difficulty with getting royalties cleared, they were not able to secure the license in time for the game's release.

In early 1997, Interplay Productions bought the U.S. publishing rights for the game from Sales Curve, intending to publish the game for the PlayStation in June 1997. However, this version of the game was never released.

Reception

GameSpot rated the game an 8.6 of 10 stating that " SWIV 3D kicks ass in the shooter genre and avid action gamers will almost certainly kick themselves for not picking up a copy"

References

1996 video games
Combat flight simulators
DOS games
Helicopter video games
Video game remakes
Video games developed in the United Kingdom
Windows games